"Another Nine Minutes" is a song written by Tom Douglas, Billy Crain and Tim Buppert and recorded by American country music group Yankee Grey. It was released in January 2000 as the second single from the group's first album, Untamed. The song reached number 15 on the Billboard Hot Country Singles & Tracks chart in May 2000.

Music video
The music video was directed by chris rogers and premiered in January 2000.

Chart performance

Year-end charts

References

2000 singles
Yankee Grey songs
Songs written by Tom Douglas (songwriter)
Song recordings produced by Josh Leo
Monument Records singles
Songs written by Billy Crain
1999 songs